Union Township is the most sparsely populated of the eight townships in Vanderburgh County, Indiana, United States.  As of the 2010 census, its population was 292 and it contained 227 housing units. This is largely due to the entire township being located within the Ohio River Floodplain.

History
Union Township was organized in 1819. It was the subject of Handly's Lessee v. Anthony, a case before the United States Supreme Court regarding the border between Indiana and Kentucky.

Geography

Unincorporated towns
 Cypress
 Rahm
 Vaughan

Adjacent townships
 Perry Township (north)

Cemeteries
The township contains Stroud Cemetery.

Rivers
 Ohio River

School districts
 Evansville-Vanderburgh School Corporation

Political districts
 Indiana's 8th congressional district
 State House District 76
 State Senate District 49

References
 
 United States Census Bureau 2007 TIGER/Line Shapefiles
 IndianaMap

External links

Townships in Vanderburgh County, Indiana
Townships in Indiana